The Newell House Museum, also known as the Robert Newell House, is located in Champoeg, Oregon, United States.  Built by Oregon politician Robert Newell in 1852, the house was acquired in 1952 by the Oregon State Society, Daughters of the American Revolution.  The house was reconstructed and opened as a museum in 1959.

The museum includes 19th century furnishings and decorations, including quilts, textiles, and handcrafts, antique firearms, gowns worn by the wives of Oregon's Governors at their inaugural balls, West Coast Native American blankets, Robert Newell's Masonic paraphernalia, and spinning equipment and looms.

An 1849 jail and an 1858 schoolhouse were moved to the property in 1959.  The schoolhouse includes the teacher's living quarters and the schoolroom. Between 2013 and 2015 the Pioneer Mothers Memorial Cabin Museum was also moved to the property

The complex includes a garden and is part of the Champoeg State Heritage Area, and is still run the Oregon State Society Daughters of the American Revolution. The complex, known as the Newell Pioneer Village, is open from March to October.

References

External links
Robert Newell House - official site

Historic house museums in Oregon
Museums in Marion County, Oregon
1852 establishments in Oregon Territory
Houses in Marion County, Oregon